Robert Hopton (c.1575-1638) was an English landowner and politician who sat in the House of Commons in two parliaments between 1604 and 1622.

Hopton was the eldest son of Sir Arthur Hopton of Witham Friary, Somerset and his wife Rachel Hall, daughter of Edmund Hall of Greatford, Lincolnshire. In 1604, he was elected Member of Parliament for Shaftesbury. Between about 1609 and 1617 he was engaged in the construction of Evercreech House. He was Sheriff of Somerset for the year 1618 to 1619. In 1621 he was elected MP for Somerset.

Family 
By his wife Jane Kemeys (daughter and heir of Rowland Keymis of the Vaudrey, or Faerdref, Monmouthshire), Robert Hopton had several children:
 Ralph Hopton, 1st Baron Hopton, who married Elizabeth (died 1646), daughter of Arthur Capell of Little Hadham, Hertfordshire, and widow of Justinian Lewin of Otterden, Kent. 
 William Hopton (University of Oxford); died young.
 Mary Hopton, who married (1) Sir Henry Mackworth, 2nd Bt. (died 1640), son and heir of Sir Thomas Mackworth, Bart., of Normanton, Rutland, and Sir Thomas Burton (died 1693) of Burton Lazars, Leicestershire.
 Margaret Hopton, who married Sir Baynham Throckmorton (1606-1664), 2nd Bart., MP, of Clearwell, Gloucestershire. 
 Catherine Hopton (died 1663), married John Wyndham (died 1649) of Orchard Wyndham, Somerset.
 Rachael Hopton, who married (1) David Kemys of Cefn Mably House, Glamorgan, and (2) Thomas Morgan of Tredegar, Monmouthshire.
 Joan Hopton (1607-1609), buried at Ditcheat.

References

1638 deaths
English landowners
High Sheriffs of Somerset
English MPs 1604–1611
English MPs 1621–1622
Year of birth uncertain